The Heart River is a river in northern Alberta, Canada. It is a major tributary of the Peace River.

The motto of the village of Nampa, Alberta is A Place close to the Heart, a reference to the river flowing through the community.

Course
It flows north through an unnamed lake, then turns westwards as it heads through Harmon Valley Park. It receives the waters from the Harmon Valley Creek as it passes by the settlement of Harmon Valley, then turns south. Up until this point, it is the North Heart River as differentiated from the South Heart River. It receives the waters of Bearhead Creek (also carrying waters from the Benjamin Creek from the east), then turns again westward. It is paralleled by the Mackenzie Northern Railway as it passes by the hamlet of Reno and through the village of Nampa. Heart River then receives Myrtle Creek, which is flowing north just east of the village of Nampa.

The watershed can be categorized into three major sub-basins: the North Heart River whose drainage area is about 830 km2; Bearhead Creek including Benjamin Creek whose drainage area is about 773 km2 and Myrtle Creek including the Nampa South Drainage Project whose drainage area is 201 km2.

Tributaries
Harmon Valley Creek
Bearhead Creek
Benjamin Creek
Myrtle Creek

See also
List of rivers of Alberta

References

Rivers of Alberta